Puchong may refer to:
Puchong
Puchong (federal constituency), represented in the Dewan Rakyat (1986–95; 2004–present)
Puchong (state constituency), formerly represented in the Selangor State Legislative Assembly (1995–2004)